Phoenix Fund (Фонд "Феникс") is a Russian  wildlife and forest conservation organization serving regions of the Russian Far East, especially Primorski Krai and Khabarovsk Krai. This area  includes globally significant biodiversity, including the Amur leopard, Siberian tiger, and other predators, as well as a number of recognized Protected Areas including national parks, wildlife refuges, and nature reserves.

Phoenix Fund was founded by Russian and U.S. conservationists and registered in Vladivostok as a Russian non-profit, non-governmental organization in March 1998. It is headquartered in Vladivostok.

Programs

Phoenix Fund defines its programs as:

 Anti-Poaching Activities, with the goal of ending the illegal hunting of tigers, leopards, and other protected species
 Resolution of Human-Tiger Conflicts, with the goal of protecting human communities while preventing the killing of tigers
 Forest Fire-Fighting
 Compensation for Damages of livestock lost to leopards, tigers, and other predators
 Ecological Education and Outreach in rural communities of the Russian Far East
 Public monitoring of industrial projects, including oil and natural gas development

Mission statement
A collective biodiversity recovery programme.

Administration
The founder director of Phoenix Fund is Sergei Bereznuk. He was formerly a tiger inspector in Rosprirodnadzor, Russia's environmental protection agency.

Affiliations
Phoenix Fund is one of the implementing organizations of the Amur Leopard and Tiger Alliance (ALTA)  and partners with non-governmental organizations in Britain, the United States, Germany, and Finland as well as Russia to conserve the Amur leopard, Siberian tiger, and their habitat and ecology. Phoenix is also a member of the 21st Century Tiger#International Tiger Coalition, made up of environmental, zoo and animal protection organizations as well as the traditional Chinese medicine community. Phoenix Fund's other partners include Wildlife Alliance and Pacific Environment in the United States, 21st Century Tiger in the United Kingdom, and other international conservation and sustainable development organizations.

History and background
Phoenix Fund was founded by Russian and U.S. conservationists and registered in Vladivostok as a Russian non-profit, non-governmental organization in March 1998. The logo of the organization is the Phoenix (mythology), which rises anew from its own ashes after death, a symbol of everlasting revival. The logo was chosen to reflect the rebirth of the Russian Far East's wildlife and habitats following environmental degradation at the end of the Soviet Union.

In 2006, Sergei Bereznuk received one of the Whitley Awards (UK) for outstanding achievements in nature conservation, related to the protection of the Amur leopard from oil pipeline development. The pipeline was believed to be a grave threat to threatened biodiversity across Siberia and the Russian Far East.

In June 2012, Sergei Bereznuk became a winner of Rolex Global Awards for Enterprise for his achievements and innovations in tiger conservation.

References

External links
  Phoenix Fund Home Page
 Amur Leopard and Tiger Alliance
 International Tiger Coalition

Environmental organizations based in Russia
Nature conservation organisations based in Europe
Organizations established in 1998
Forest conservation organizations
Forestry in Russia